Thompson Pass is a 2,600 foot-high (855 meter-high) gap in the Chugach Mountains northeast of Valdez, Alaska.  It is the snowiest place in Alaska, recording  of snow per year on average. In the winter of 1952–1953,  of snow fell—the most ever recorded in one season at one location in Alaska. It is also the most snow ever recorded in one season at one location anywhere in the fifty states.  The pass also holds the Alaska record for the most snow in a single day:  fell on December 29, 1955.

The pass was named in 1899 by U.S. Army captain William Abercrombie "in compliment to Hon. Frank Thomson, of Pennsylvania", but he spelled the name "Thompson" on his sketched map, and that spelling stuck. The pass had been used by Alaska Native Ahtna people for generations prior to Abercrombie's arrival, but he marked and defined a trail through the pass for use by Klondike Gold Rush miners. His route, which became the Valdez-Eagle Trail, later was used by the Washington-Alaska Military Cable and Telegraph System, which strung cables through Thompson Pass. The path through the pass continued to be improved, and automobiles first drove the entire length of the trail in 1913. By that point, it had become the Valdez-Fairbanks Trail, and it was renamed the Richardson Road in 1919.

Because of heavy snowfall in Thompson Pass, the Richardson Highway was used only in summer. Not until 1950, when a freight company foreman demonstrated that the pass could be kept open with snowplows, was the road drivable year-round. The trail through the pass remained gravel until 1955, when the Alaska Road Commission (part of the US Department of the Interior) paved it.

Pipeline construction
In the early 1970s, Thompson Pass was the scene of frantic activity as thousands of workers built a portion of the Trans-Alaska Pipeline System from a camp located nearby. Heavy snowfall in the pass slowed work in the winter, but the pipeline was completed by 1977, and oil today flows through the pass on an almost constant basis.

Because Valdez is the southern terminus of the pipeline and Thompson Pass provides the only overland transportation link to Valdez, the state of Alaska maintains a road service station in the pass to keep it plowed and ice-free year-round. This facility includes Thompson Pass Airport,a short landing strip used by state aircraft. The work of keeping the highway through the pass clear is extremely challenging due to weather conditions and was highlighted in the Discovery Channel television special Alaska: Most Extreme.

Recreation
The pass is a popular destination for tourists and adventurers. Heliskiing and snowboarding are popular recreational activities.

Protected areas

Blueberry Lake State Recreation Site is a  park in Thompson Pass. It has a lake with Arctic grayling in it, a campground, and several picnic areas. It has been described as “one of Alaska’s most beautifully situated campgrounds”.

Worthington Glacier State Recreation Site is a  site with picnic areas, interpretive displays, and trails enabling visitors to approach the glacier.

Climate

Thompson Pass has an alpine tundra climate (ET) with one of the highest snow totals in the world.

See also

 Mount Billy Mitchell (Chugach Mountains)
 Keystone Canyon, which is the route connecting the Pass to Valdez

References

Landforms of Chugach Census Area, Alaska
Mountain passes of Alaska